Hortonia is an unincorporated community in Rutland County, Vermont, United States.

Notes

Unincorporated communities in Rutland County, Vermont
Unincorporated communities in Vermont